Think Global (formal name Development Education Association, also known as DEA) is a British charity which "works to educate and engage people about global issues".    It was founded in 1993 by a group of major charities including CAFOD, Oxfam, ActionAid, Save the Children and Christian Aid, and evolved from NADEC, the National Association for Development Education Centres; in January 2011 it adopted the "working name" Think Global to reflect a broadening of its interests.

See also
 Restless Development
 WYSE International

References

External links

Development charities based in the United Kingdom
Educational charities based in the United Kingdom
Organisations based in the London Borough of Southwark